Liao Bingxiong was a Chinese political cartoonist, painter and calligrapher. He remained active from 1934 until he gave up in 1995 (with a 20-year break between 1957 and 1978). Liao is widely regarded as one of China's foremost political cartoonists. Liao integrated folk art; Cantonese rhymes and idioms; and woodcut into many of his cartoons.

Biography
He was born Liao Dongsheng. At age 18, he wrote an article for the newspaper Cheng Bao in Guangzhou, and signed the article Bingxiong - i.e. "brother of Bing" after his little sister Liao Bing. As an explanation, Liao Bingxiong is said to have asked: "Am I not Liao Bing's brother?" 

Early in his life, he worked as a teacher. He drew anti-war illustrations during World War II, and later joined a comic artists organization in Hong Kong. In 1946 his satirical Spring and Autumn in the Cat Kingdom debuted in Chongqing. In the early 1950s, he returned to the mainland, where he drew children's comics.

Over many years, in a long series of cartoons and calligraphic pieces, Liao documented corruption and abuses of power under the Kuomintang; the Japanese occupation; the regime of Mao Zedong; and many subsequent events. Liao learned to draw by copying, but he never received formal training in art. For this reason he called himself yěshēng Dongwu, "a wild animal.”

Liao died in 2006, at the age of 91. A gallery is named in his honour at the Guangzhou Museum of Art, where some of his works are on display.

Style as a cartoonist and calligrapher
Liao Bingxiong said: "I was sad for the good people who have been victimized.  I was angry against the evil people who hurt others.  That was why I drew mostly sad and angry cartoons...."

Early in his career,  Liao was concerned that his drawings needed to be understood even by those who could not read – so he mainly drew cartoons without any text. In 1938, inspired both by traditional Chinese approaches and by the Mexican artist Miguel Covarrubias, Liao extended his repertoire, and began experimenting increasingly with color and form. Liao's calligraphy has been described direct and "vulgar".

References

1915 births
2006 deaths
Artists from Guangzhou
Chinese editorial cartoonists
Painters from Guangdong
Republic of China painters
People's Republic of China calligraphers
Republic of China calligraphers
People's Republic of China painters
Educators from Guangdong